Reinhold Becker (born 23 May 1959) is a German former swimmer. He competed in two events at the 1976 Summer Olympics.

References

External links
 

1959 births
Living people
People from Troisdorf
Sportspeople from Cologne (region)
German male swimmers
Olympic swimmers of West Germany
Swimmers at the 1976 Summer Olympics